Radu Albot and Rubin Statham were the defending champions but only Statham chose to defend his title, partnering Hiroki Moriya. Statham lost in the first round to Sriram Balaji and Saketh Myneni.

Gong Maoxin and Zhang Ze won the title after defeating Hsieh Cheng-peng and Christopher Rungkat 7–5, 2–6, [10–5] in the final.

Seeds

Draw

References
 Main Draw

Ningbo Challenger - Doubles